This is a list of historical formations of the United States Army.
Units still in existence are in bold.

For specific eras:
 Formations of the United States Army during the Mexican Revolution
 Formations of the United States Army during World War I
 Formations of the United States Army during World War II
 Formations of the United States Army during the Vietnam War
 Formations of the United States Army during the War on Terrorism
 List of current formations of the United States Army

Army groups
 1st Army Group (World War II "phantom" formation)
 6th Army Group
 12th Army Group
 15th Army Group

Field armies
 First Allied Airborne Army
 First United States Army—U.S. Army Training, Readiness, and Mobilization command formation
 Second United States Army—United States Army Cyber Command
 Third United States Army—United States Army Central command formation
 Fourth United States Army
 Fifth United States Army—United States Army North command formation
 Sixth United States Army—United States Army South command formation
 Seventh United States Army—United States Army Europe command formation
 Eighth United States Army—United States Army Korea command formation
 Ninth United States Army—United States Army Africa command formation
 Tenth United States Army
 Fourteenth United States Army (World War II "phantom" formation)
 Fifteenth United States Army

Army corps
Airborne, armored, and infantry are grouped separately.  The numbering system for the airborne corps is a continuation of the infantry numbering system.

Airborne corps
 XVIII Airborne Corps

Armored corps
 I Armored Corps (reflagged as the Seventh Army)
 II Armored Corps (reflagged as XVIII Airborne Corps)
 III Armored Corps (reflagged as XIX Corps)
 IV Armored Corps (reflagged as XX Corps)

Army corps

I Corps
 II Corps
 III Corps
 IV Corps
 V Corps
 VI Corps
 VII Corps
 VIII Corps
 IX Corps

 X Corps
 XI Corps
 XII Corps
 XIII Corps
 XIV Corps
 XV Corps
 XVI Corps
 XVII Corps

 XIX Corps
 XX Corps
 XXI Corps
 XXII Corps
 XXIII Corps
 XXIV Corps
 XXXVI Corps
 XXXVII Corps

Army divisions

Air assault divisions
 11th Air Assault Division (Test) (1963–1965)

Airborne divisions
 6th Airborne Division (phantom World War II division)
 9th Airborne Division (phantom World War II division)
 11th Airborne Division "Angels"
 13th Airborne Division "Lucky Thirteenth"
 15th Airborne Division (unorganized World War II division)
 17th Airborne Division "Golden Talons"
 18th Airborne Division (phantom World War II division)
 21st Airborne Division (phantom World War II division)
 80th Airborne Division (1946–52)
 82nd Airborne Division "All American"
 84th Airborne Division (1946–52)
 100th Airborne Division (1946–52)
 101st Airborne Division "Screaming Eagles"
 108th Airborne Division (1946–52), Later Division was Army Reserve Division, serving as in Infantry and later Training missions
 135th Airborne Division (phantom World War II division)

Armored divisions
 1st Armored Division "Old Ironsides"
 2nd Armored Division "Hell On Wheels"
 3rd Armored Division "Spearhead Division"
 4th Armored Division "Breakthrough Division"
 5th Armored Division "Victory"
 6th Armored Division "Super Sixth", "Bulgebusters"
 7th Armored Division "Lucky Seventh"
 8th Armored Division "Showhorse"
 9th Armored Division "The Phantom Division"
 10th Armored Division "Tiger Division"
 11th Armored Division "Thunderbolt Division"
 12th Armored Division "Hellcat Division"
 13th Armored Division
 14th Armored Division
 15th Armored Division (phantom World War II division)
 16th Armored Division
 18th Armored Division (unorganized World War II division)
 19th Armored Division (unorganized World War II division)
 20th Armored Division
 21st Armored Division (unorganized World War II division)
 22nd Armored Division (unorganized World War II division)
 25th Armored Division (phantom World War II division)
 27th Armored Division
 30th Armored Division
 39th Armored Division (phantom World War II division) (possible post war Armored Brigade, not division)
 40th Armored Division
 48th Armored Division (Georgia Army National Guard to 1967)
 49th Armored Division "Lone Star" TX ARNG (1946–68, 1973–2004)
 50th Armored Division "Jersey Blues" NJ ARNG (up to early 1990s)

Cavalry divisions
 Cavalry Division—authorized as the 4th Regular Army division in 1913; never officially numerically designated.
 1st Cavalry Division
 2nd Cavalry Division
 3rd Cavalry Division
 15th Cavalry Division
 21st Cavalry Division
 22nd Cavalry Division
 23rd Cavalry Division
 24th Cavalry Division
 61st Cavalry Division
 62nd Cavalry Division
 63rd Cavalry Division
 64th Cavalry Division
 65th Cavalry Division
 66th Cavalry Division

Infantry divisions
 1st Infantry Division "The Big Red One"
 2nd Infantry Division "Indian Head Division"
 3rd Infantry Division "Rock of the Marne"
 4th Infantry Division "Ivy Division", "Iron Horse"
 5th Infantry Division "Red Diamond"
 6th Infantry Division "Red Star"
 7th Infantry Division "Bayonet Division"
 8th Infantry Division "Pathfinders", "Golden Arrow"
 9th Infantry Division "Octfoil", "Old Reliables"
 10th Division (World War I)
 10th Mountain Infantry Division (1943–1957)
 11th Division (World War I)
 12th Division (World War I)
 12th Infantry Division "Philippine division"
 13th Division "Lucky 13 Division" (World War I)
 14th Division (World War I)
 14th Infantry Division (phantom World War II division)
 15th Division (World War I)
 16th Division (World War I)
 17th Division (World War I)
 18th Division (World War I)
 19th Division "Moon & Star"
 19th Infantry Division (phantom World War II division)
 20th Division (World War I)
 22nd Infantry Division (phantom World War II division)
 23rd Infantry Division "Americal Division"
 24th Infantry Division "Victory Division"
 25th Infantry Division "Tropic Lightning"
 26th Infantry Division "Yankee Division"
 27th Infantry Division "New York Division"
 28th Infantry Division "Keystone Division"
 29th Infantry Division "The Blue and Gray"
 30th Infantry Division "Old Hickory"
 31st Infantry Division "Dixie Division"
 32nd Infantry Division "Red Arrow"
 33rd Infantry Division "Prairie Division"
 34th Infantry Division "Red Bull Division"
 35th Infantry Division "Santa Fe Division"
 36th Infantry Division "Texas Division"
 37th Infantry Division "Buckeye Division"
 38th Infantry Division "Cyclone Division"
 39th Infantry Division "Delta Division"
 40th Infantry Division "Sunburst Division"
 41st Infantry Division "Sunset Division"
 42nd Infantry Division "Rainbow Division"
 43rd Infantry Division "Red Wing Division"
 44th Infantry Division
 45th Infantry Division "Thunderbird Division"
 46th Infantry Division (United States) (phantom World War II division, postwar National Guard formation)
 47th Infantry Division (Post-war National Guard Division nicknamed "Viking")
 48th Infantry Division (United States) (phantom World War II division, postwar National Guard formation)
 49th Infantry Division (Post-war National Guard Division nicknamed "49'ers")
 50th Infantry Division (phantom World War II division)
 51st Infantry Division (Post-war National Guard Division)
 52nd Infantry Division
 55th Infantry Division (phantom World War II division)
 59th Infantry Division (phantom World War II division)
 61st Infantry Division (see Divisions of the United States Army, unorganized World War II division)
 62nd Infantry Division (see Divisions of the United States Army, unorganized World War II division)
 63rd Infantry Division
 65th Infantry Division
 66th Infantry Division
 an infantry division with the number 67 was never organized during World War II (see Divisions of the United States Army)
 68th Infantry Division - never organized during World War II (see Divisions of the United States Army)
 69th Infantry Division
 70th Infantry Division "Trailblazers"
 71st Infantry Division "Red Circle"
 an infantry division with the number 72 was never organized during World War II (see Divisions of the United States Army)
 an infantry division with the number 73 was never organized during World War II (see Divisions of the United States Army)
 an infantry division with the number 74 was never organized during World War II (see Divisions of the United States Army)
 75th Infantry Division
 76th Infantry Division "Liberty Bell Division"
 77th Infantry Division "Metropolitan Division" also "Statue of Liberty Division"
 78th Infantry Division "Lightning Division"
 79th Infantry Division "Liberty Division"
 80th Infantry Division "Blue Ridge Division"
 81st Infantry Division "Wildcat Division"
 82nd Infantry Division "All American Division" (Later Airborne Division with same number)
 83rd Infantry Division "Thunderbolt Division"
 84th Infantry Division "Railsplitters"
 85th Infantry Division "Custer Division"
 86th Infantry Division "Blackhawk Division"
 87th Infantry Division "Golden Acorn"
 88th Infantry Division "Blue Devils"
 89th Infantry Division "Rolling W Division"
 90th Infantry Division "Tough Ombres"
 91st Infantry Division "Wild West"
 92nd Infantry Division "Buffalo Division"
 93rd Infantry Division "Blue Helmets"
 94th Infantry Division "Neuf-Cats"
 95th Infantry Division "Ironman Division" (Also "Victory Division", and "Iron Men of Metz Division")
 96th Infantry Division "Deadeye Division"
 97th Infantry Division "Trident Division"
 98th Infantry Division "Iroquois"
 99th Infantry Division "Checkerboard Division"
 100th Infantry Division "Century"
 101st Division (Later Airborne Division with same number)
 102nd Infantry Division "Ozark Division"
 103rd Infantry Division "Cactus Division"
 104th Infantry Division "Timberwolf"
 intended as a Black formation, an infantry division with the number 105 was never organized during World War II
 106th Infantry Division "Golden Lion Division"
 an infantry division with the number 107 was never organized during World War II
 108th Infantry Division {phantom World War II Division}
 108th Infantry Division "Golden Griffons" (Formerly Airborne Division of same number)
 109th Infantry Division (phantom World War II division)
 112th Infantry Division (phantom World War II division)
 119th Infantry Division (phantom World War II division)
 125th Infantry Division (phantom World War II division)
 130th Infantry Division (phantom World War II division)
 141st Infantry Division (phantom World War II division)
 157th Infantry Division (phantom World War II division)
 Americal Division (see 23rd Infantry Division)
 Hawaiian Division (see also: 24th Infantry Division; 25th Infantry Division)
 Maneuver Division (1911)
 Panama Canal Division (inactivated 1932)
 Philippine Division (see 12th Infantry Division)

Light divisions
 10th Light Division (Alpine)
 71st Light Division (Truck)
 89th Light Division (Pack)

Mountain divisions
 10th Mountain Division

Reserve training divisions
 75th Division
 78th Division "Lightning Division"
 80th Division "Blue Ridge Division"
 84th Division "Lincoln County Division"
 85th Division "Custer Division"
 87th Division "Golden Acorn Division"
 91st Division "Wild West Division"
 95th Division "Victory Division"
 98th Division "Iroquois Division"
 100th Division "Century Division"
 104th Division "Timberwolf Division"
 108th Division "Golden Griffons"

References

Further reading
 

Lists of United States Army units and formations